The Department of Education was an Australian government department that existed between December 1972 and March 1983.

History
The department was one of eight new departments established by the Whitlam government, a wide restructuring that revealed some of the new government's program.

Scope
Information about the department's functions and/or government funding allocation could be found in the Administrative Arrangements Orders, the annual Portfolio Budget Statements and in the department's annual reports.

According to the Administrative Arrangements Order issued 19 December 1972, at its creation, the department was responsible for Education, including education in the Northern Territory of Australia, the Australian Capital Territory and Norfolk Island.

Structure
The department was an Australian Public Service department, staffed by officials who were responsible to the minister for education, initially Kim Edward Beazley (until June 1975), then Margaret Guilfoyle as a caretaker minister for the month leading up to the December 1975 election (after the 11 November 1975 Dismissal in which the governor-general appointed Leader of the Opposition, Malcolm Fraser, as caretaker prime minister and he in turn appointed caretaker ministers). Subsequent ministers were John Carrick (1975‑1979), Wal Fife (1979‑1982) and finally Peter Baume (1982‑1983).

The department was headed by a secretary, initially (acting in the position) Hugh Ennor (until January 1973) and then Kenneth Norman Jones (from January 1973).

References

Education
Australia, Education